Psittacastis argentata is a moth in the family Depressariidae. It was described by Edward Meyrick in 1921. It is found in Brazil.

The wingspan is about 13 mm. The forewings are ferruginous with a whitish-grey ochreous streak from the costa near the base to a leaden spot above the dorsum at two-fifths, a greyish streak from the base along the fold to this. There is also an oblique trapezoidal blue-leaden-metallic patch resting on the middle of the costa, one angle reaching two-thirds across the wing, the other projecting near the costa posteriorly. There is an extremely fine very oblique leaden striga from the costa near beyond this to a very oblique blue-leaden striga in the disc at four-fifths, a blackish dash and some dark fuscous suffusion in the disc between this and the preceding patch, and some dark fuscous suffusion in the disc before the patch. There is also a streak of leaden suffusion along the posterior fourth of the fold and a fine blackish line towards the apex, as well as two small spots of bluish suffusion transversely placed above the tornus. The hindwings are dark grey.

References

Moths described in 1921
Psittacastis